William Crosby Percy Austin (12 June 1884 – 15 June 1975) was an English character actor. He was the first actor to play Alfred in a Batman adaptation.

Early years
William Austin was born in Georgetown in British Guiana. His parents were Charles Percy Austin and Rosalie Ann Sarah Austin. On the death of his father, he was brought to the United Kingdom to complete his education. He was the brother of actor Albert Austin.

Austin attended Reading College in England and gained theatrical experience via Little Theatre and Drama Shop plays.

Career
Austin filled a business post in Shanghai and on being sent to San Francisco by the company he worked for, he decided to stay in America and take up acting on the stage and later in films. Beginning in 1919, Austin acted at the Morosco Theatre in Los Angeles for three years. He began working in films in 1922.

He appeared in many American films and serials between the 1920s and the 1940s, though the vast majority of his roles were small and uncredited. Of the silent films Austin appeared in, he is best remembered as the sidekick friend of Clara Bow in Bow's best known film It (1927). He supported Laurel and Hardy in two of their films, Duck Soup and County Hospital.

Austin worked as a film editor from 1928 to 1930, primarily working with Westerns.

Batman
Austin's portrayal of Batman's butler, Alfred, in the 1943 Batman serial is the iconic portrayal still used in the comics. Previous to being played by Austin, the character was fat and had no facial hair. Performed by Austin, the character was thin with a moustache. Shortly after the serial was released, Alfred in the comics was changed to match the look of the serial; this representation of the character has for the most part continued to this day except for the live action films, the Birds of Prey series, and the Deadshot short in Batman: Gotham Knight where he has no moustache.

Death
On 15 June 1975, Austin died in Newport Beach, California, three days after his 91st birthday. He was buried in Pacific View Memorial Park, Corona del Mar, California.

Selected filmography

 Common Sense (1920) – Reggie Barrett
 Handle with Care (1922) – Peter Carter
 The Cowboy King (1922) – Wilbur
 Rich Men's Wives (1922) – Reggie
 Ruggles of Red Gap (1923) – Mr. Belknap–Jackson
 The Reckless Age (1924) – Lord Harrowby
 The Garden of Weeds (1924) – Archie
 In Love with Love (1924) – George Sears
 The Night Club (1925) – Gerly – The Valet
 Who Cares (1925) – Dr. Harry Oldershaw
 Head Winds (1925) – Theodore Van Felt
 Seven Days (1925) – Dal Brown
 The Best People (1925) – Arthur Rockmere
 The Fate of a Flirt (1925) – Riggs
 What Happened to Jones (1926) – Henry Fuller
 The Far Cry (1926) – Eric Lancefield
 Fig Leaves (1926) – André's Assistant
 Collegiate (1926) – G. Horace Crumbleigh
 Her Big Night (1926) – Harold Crosby
 West of Broadway (1926) – Mortimer Allison
 The Flaming Forest (1926) – Alfred Wimbledon
 One Hour of Love (1927) – Louis Carruthers
 It (1927) – 'Monty' Montgomery
 Ritzy (1927) – Algy
 The World at Her Feet (1927) – Det. Hall
 Swim Girl, Swim (1927) – Mr. Spangle, PhD
 Silk Stockings (1927) – George Bagnall
 The Small Bachelor (1927)
 Honeymoon Hate (1927) – Banning–Green
 Drums of Love (1928) – Raymond of Boston
 Red Hair (1928) – Dr. Eustace Gill
 The Fifty-Fifty Girl (1928) – Engineer
 Just Married (1928) – Percy Jones
 Someone to Love (1928) – Aubrey Weems
 What a Night! (1928) – Percy Penfield
 The Mysterious Dr. Fu Manchu (1929) – Sylvester Wadsworth
 Illusion (1929) – Mr. Z
 Sweetie (1929) – Prof. Willow
 The Marriage Playground (1929) – Lord Wrench
 Embarrassing Moments (1929) – Jasper Hickson
 The Man from Blankley's (1930) – Mr. Poffley
 The Return of Dr. Fu Manchu (1930) – Sylvester Wadsworth
 The Flirting Widow (1930) – James Raleigh
 Let's Go Native (1930) – Basil Pistol
 Along Came Youth (1930) – Eustace
 A Tailor Made Man (1931) – Jellicott
 Corsair (1931) – Richard Bentinck
 High Society (1932) – Wilberforce Strangeways
 Don't Be a Dummy (1932) – Lord Tony Probus
 The Private Life of Henry VIII (1933) – Duke of Cleves
 Alice in Wonderland (1933) – Gryphon
 Three Men in a Boat (1933) – Harris
 Once to Every Bachelor (1934) – Mathews
 The Gay Divorcee (1934) – Cyril Glossop
 Thirty-Day Princess (1934)
 Redheads on Parade (1935) – Trelawney Redfern
 The Goose and the Gander (1935) – Arthur Summers
 $1000 a Minute (1935) – Salesman
 Renfrew of the Royal Mounted (1937) – Constable Kelly
 Doctor Rhythm (1938) – Mr. Martingale (The Floorwalker)
 The Adventures of Sherlock Holmes (1939) – Inquisitive Stranger
 Charley's Aunt (1941) – Cricket Match Spectator
 Batman (1943, Serial) – Alfred Beagle (uncredited)
 My Kingdom for a Cook (1943) – Brooks
 The Return of the Vampire (1943) – Detective Gannett
 The Ghost Goes Wild (1947) – Barnaby (final film role)

References

External links

1884 births
1975 deaths
English male film actors
English male silent film actors
20th-century English male actors
British expatriate male actors in the United States